The Love God? is a 1969 American comedy film starring Don Knotts and Edmond O'Brien. It was written and directed by Nat Hiken, who died between the completion of shooting and the film's release. The Love God? marked a change of pace for Knotts, who had exclusively appeared in family comedies, and was an attempt to integrate Knotts into the adult-oriented films that dominated the late 1960s and early 1970s.

Plot
Abner Peacock's beloved birdwatching magazine The Peacock is in financial crisis. Desperate to stay afloat, Abner takes on new partner Osborn Tremain, who has an agenda of his own: to publish a sexy men's magazine. Tremain and his wife Evelyn can only do so by taking over Abner's magazine, as Tremain has been convicted for sending obscene material through the mail.

Before Abner can stop the Tremains, the first issue sells more than 40 million copies and Abner becomes the unwilling spokesman for First Amendment rights. Swept up in adulation, Abner soon adopts the swinging bachelor lifestyle.

Cast and characters
Don Knotts as Abner Audubon Peacock IV
Anne Francis as Lisa LaMonica
Edmond O'Brien as Osborn Tremain
James Gregory as Darrell Evans Hughes
Maureen Arthur as Evelyn Tremain
Maggie Peterson as Rose Ellen Wilkerson

Reception
Los Angeles Times critic Kevin Thomas called the film "one of the intentionally funniest and most pertinent pictures to come out of Universal in years."

In the San Francisco Examiner, Stanley Eichelbaum described the film as "an engaging spoof on the current vogue for the sexual put on."

According to Don Knotts, resistance to seeing him in anything other than clean family films was greater than Universal Pictures had anticipated, and they had trouble booking The Love God? in theaters: "I'm not sure how many, but I heard that a great number of theaters turned the picture down. In any case, it did not do well at all." The film was rated M (for "Mature Audiences", later replaced with PG) by the Motion Picture Association when it was released. In later years, changes to the film rating system meant that this rating was no longer considered sufficient for The Love God?, so the film's rating was bumped up to PG-13 (for "Parents Strongly Cautioned") and given the flag "sex-related material."

The film was panned by Judith Crist when it premiered on television, who said that its "smutty pseudo-satire on pornography, civil liberties and bird-watching would be rated as sub-Z by anyone with a knowledge of the alphabet, let alone an iota of taste."

References

External links 
 
 

1969 films
American comedy films
Films scored by Vic Mizzy
1969 comedy films
Films set in New York City
1960s English-language films
1960s American films